Scopula vigensis is a moth of the  family Geometridae. It is found in Mexico.

References

Moths described in 1938
vigensis
Moths of Central America